Marijo Tot (born 2 June 1972) is a Croatian football manager and former player who played as a left back.

He last served as assistant coach of the Iranian national team under Dragan Skočić.

Playing career
As a player, he has played for Inter Zaprešić and NK Celje as a left back, retiring at the young age of 26 and enrolling into the Croatian Football Federation coaching academy.

Managerial career
Three seasons from 2000 to 2003 he was assistant manager of NK Brotnjo, being part of three most successful seasons in the history of this club, playing European qualifying matches each year. In 2003, as 31 year old coach, he became the youngest manager in all Bosnian clubs ever when he took a managerial role of Bosnian Super League club NK Brotnjo

He became a manager of Croatia Women National Team from 2006 to 2008 season.

In the season 2008–2009, he became assistant manager of HNK Rijeka.

He has been assistant manager to Vahid Halilhodžić at Dinamo Zagreb during 2010–2011 season. When Halilhodžić was dismissed in early May 2011, Tot takes over Dinamo for the remaining matches  and wins the Championship title for the 2010/2011 season. He also won the 2010–11 Croatian Cup with Dinamo, defeating NK Varaždin 8–2 on aggregate in the final.

He then accepted the job as manager of NK Lokomotiva Zagreb.

Later on this UEFA-certified coach instructor and instructor moved to Malaysia in August 2012 to join Kedah FA, one of the biggest teams in Malaysian history, replacing Wan Jamak Wan Hassan. He coached the team until the end of July 2013, choosing not to renew his contract with Kedah.

Tot spent two seasons in China, managing first Harbin Yiteng in 2014 and Changchun Yatai F.C. in 2015 season, which makes him the only Croatian manager ever to have managed two of China Super League teams.

At the end of 2016 Tot took over Croatian First League club Istra 1961 and through series of good showings secured one of the most calm season finishes that Istrian club has seen in recent years in Croatian First League.

Immediately after finishing his successful role as manager of Istra 1961, in June 2017 Marijo Tot accepted an offer to become manager of China League One side Zhejiang Yiteng F.C. He parted ways with the club on 31 December after securing their stay in the league.

In October 2018 he joined the Saudi Premier League football giant Al-Ittihad as assistant to the head coach Slaven Bilić, the most famous Croatian football manager.

In March 2021, at the invitation of his fellow Croatian coach Dragan Skočić, Tot joined the Iran national team. From an almost hopeless situation in the qualifiers, Iran became the first team from Asia to qualify for the 2022 World Cup in Qatar with a series of victories that drew attention to the Croatian coaching duo.

Honours

Manager
Dinamo Zagreb
Croatian Cup: 2010–11
Croatian First League 2010–11

References

External links
 
Profile at Global Sports Agency
Personal website

1972 births
Living people
People from Županja
Association football fullbacks
Croatian footballers
NK Celje players
NK Inter Zaprešić players
Croatian football managers
NK Brotnjo managers
GNK Dinamo Zagreb managers
NK Lokomotiva Zagreb managers
Changchun Yatai F.C. managers
NK Istra 1961 managers
Croatian expatriate football managers
Expatriate football managers in Bosnia and Herzegovina
Croatian expatriate sportspeople in Bosnia and Herzegovina
Expatriate football managers in Malaysia
Croatian expatriate sportspeople in Malaysia
Expatriate football managers in China
Croatian expatriate sportspeople in China
Croatian expatriate sportspeople in Saudi Arabia
Croatian expatriate sportspeople in Iran
HNK Rijeka non-playing staff
GNK Dinamo Zagreb non-playing staff